Alcove Springs was a popular stop along the Oregon Trail near Independence Crossing in Marshall County, Kansas.  Travelers along the trail gave the springs its name. The words 'Alcove Springs', carved into the hard limestone cliff by the Donner Party, can still be seen, although some of the carving has weathered away. It is located about four miles north of Blue Rapids, along the Big Blue River.

Across the road from the Alcove Springs park is another park commemorating the Oregon Trail and features history, wagon swales and a D.A.R. marker memorializing Sarah Keyes, a member of the Donner Party who died in 1846.  The exact location of her burial is unknown.

Alcove Springs was listed on the National Register of Historic Places in 1972.

References

External links
 Alcove Spring & Waterfall - Kansas Travel
 Places to Visit—Alcove Spring - GeoKansas

Oregon Trail
Protected areas of Marshall County, Kansas
Parks in Kansas
Natural features on the National Register of Historic Places in Kansas
Bodies of water of Marshall County, Kansas
Springs of Kansas
National Register of Historic Places in Marshall County, Kansas